The Clarissa McKeyes Inman House, also known as Ariel Terraces, is a house in Portland, Oregon, designed by David L. Williams and listed on the National Register of Historic Places.

See also
 National Register of Historic Places listings in Northwest Portland, Oregon

References

External links
 Inman, Clarissa McKeys, House (Portland, Oregon), UO Libraries

1926 establishments in Oregon
Beaux-Arts architecture in Oregon
Hillside, Portland, Oregon
Houses completed in 1926
Houses on the National Register of Historic Places in Portland, Oregon
Neoclassical architecture in Oregon
Prairie School architecture in Oregon
Portland Historic Landmarks